The Kenyan dwarf blind snake (Afrotyphlops nanus) is a species of snake in the Typhlopidae family.

References

Endemic fauna of Kenya
nanus
Reptiles described in 2009